Danny Pate (born March 23, 1979) is an American retired professional cyclist, who competed professionally in road racing, cyclo-cross and mountain bike racing between 2000 and 2018 for the , Prime Alliance,  and  teams.

Career
Born in Colorado Springs, Colorado, Pate took his only professional victory at the 2007 Tour of Missouri, winning the penultimate stage.

He made his first start at both the Giro d'Italia and the Tour de France in 2008. In the latter, he was part of the breakaway on the fifteenth stage with three other riders, and was still clear with Simon Gerrans and Egoi Martínez heading into the final kilometre of the stage, an uphill finish to Prato Nevoso in Italy. He was out-sprinted by Gerrans and Martínez, sitting up for a third-place stage finish. He took a further third-place Grand Tour stage finish at the following year's Giro d'Italia, this time as part of a 25-rider breakaway; he was out-sprinted by Michele Scarponi and Félix Cárdenas at the finish in Benevento.

He retired from racing at the 2018 Colorado Classic, after finishing the last stage in Denver.

Major results

1997
 1st  Junior race, National Cyclo-cross Championships
1998
 1st  Road race, National Under-23 Road Championships
2000
 9th Rund um die Nürnberger Altstadt
2001
 1st  Time trial, UCI Under-23 Road World Championships
 1st Overall Triptyque Ardennais
 2nd Ronde van Vlaanderen U23
 8th La Côte Picarde
 9th Overall Sea Otter Classic
 9th Prix de la Ville de Soissons
2002
 1st Overall International Tour de Toona
 1st Lake Eola Criterium
 2nd Road race, National Road Championships
 3rd Overall Tour of the Gila
 3rd USPRO Championships
 5th Overall GP de Beauce
2003
 1st Stage 2 Tour de White Rock
 4th Overall GP de Beauce
2004
 3rd Road race, National Road Championships
2005
 1st Mountains classification Nature Valley Grand Prix
 2nd Road race, National Road Championships
 2nd USPRO Championships
 6th Overall Redlands Bicycle Classic
 7th Overall International Cycling Classic
1st Stages 3 & 15
 9th San Francisco Grand Prix
2006
 2nd Overall Rás Tailteann
1st Stage 2
 3rd Road race, National Road Championships
 3rd Overall Tour de Beauce
1st Stage 4 (ITT)
 3rd Reading Classic (Pro Cycling Tour)
 6th Lancaster Classic
 9th Overall Tour du Limousin
 10th Overall Tour de l'Ain
2007
 1st Stage 5 Tour of Missouri
 2nd Time trial, National Road Championships
 3rd Overall Tour de Beauce
 4th Lancaster Classic
2008
 1st Stage 1 (TTT) Giro d'Italia
 1st Stage 4 (TTT) Tour de Georgia
 3rd Road race, National Road Championships
2009
 3rd Overall Critérium International
 5th Overall Tour Méditerranéen
2010
 10th Gran Premio Nobili Rubinetterie – Coppa Papà Carlo
2013
 1st Stage 2 (TTT) Giro d'Italia
 1st Stage 1b (TTT) Giro del Trentino
2015
 1st Stage 1 (TTT) Tour de Romandie

References

External links

 Danny Pate profile at Rally Cycling
 
 

1979 births
Living people
American male cyclists
Sportspeople from Colorado Springs, Colorado
Cyclists from Colorado